B was a banking brand in the United Kingdom which operated between 2016 and 2019 as a trading division of Clydesdale Bank plc. B focused on app-based banking and computer learning of personal finances to help customers manage their money.

History

B offered an app-based current accounts that is paired with a savings account. B's bank cards use the Mastercard system for both debit and credit cards.
 B also offered a credit card, with a selling point of consistently low interest rates and no foreign transaction fees.

In June 2019 CYBG plc, the parent company of Clydesdale Bank plc announced that the B brand was to be phased out and replaced by the Virgin Money brand in December 2019.

B closed applications for new current accounts on 4 December 2019 and existing B accounts were re-branded as Virgin Money the following day.

See also

References

External links 

 

Banks established in 2016
Companies based in Glasgow